This list includes Irish supercentenarians (people from Ireland who have attained the age of at least 110 years) whose lifespans have been verified by an international body that specifically deals in longevity research, such as the Gerontology Research Group (GRG). There have been, including emigrants, 12 verified supercentenarians from Ireland. The oldest person ever to die in Ireland was Katherine Plunket at 111 years, 327 days. The oldest ever person born in Ireland was Kathleen Snavely, who died aged 113 years, 140 days in the United States.

Irish supercentenarians 
Below is a list of the oldest people who were born on the island of Ireland.

Notes

References

External links
 Looking at the secrets of Ireland’s centenarians Irish Times
 Ireland's Oldest People [Finbarr Connolly Website]

Irish
Supercentenarians
Irish centenarians